This is a list of programs broadcast by Treehouse TV, a Canadian television channel for preschoolers launched on November 1, 1997. It is owned by Corus Entertainment (formerly owned by Shaw Communications), airing both live-action and animated programs.

Current programming
As of February 2023:

 1 Ended but still airing for reruns.

Original programming

Animated series

Reruns

Acquired programming

Animated series

Live-action series

Programming from Nickelodeon

Upcoming programming

Original programming

Animated series

Former programming

Original programming

Animated series

Live-action series

Acquired programming

Live action series
 3, 2, 1 Let's Go! (September 8, 2010 – August 28, 2013)
 The Adventures of Dudley the Dragon (September 9, 2002 – September 3, 2005)
 Barney & Friends (November 1, 1997 – August 16, 2012)
 Bear in the Big Blue House (September 1998 – January 26, 2001; September 3, 2001 – September 1, 2010)

 Beezoo's Attic (February 1999 – September 3, 2000)
 Blue's Room (September 10, 2005 – December 20, 2008)
 Boohbah (April 26, 2004 – September 1, 2006) (live action and animated)
 Bookmice (November 1, 1997 – 1999)
 Elmo: The Musical (2013–2016)
 Elmo's World (November 8, 2005 – August 29, 2013)
 The Fresh Beat Band (January 15, 2010 – May 23, 2016)
 Global Grover (November 7, 2005 – August 30, 2013)
 Hallo Spencer (November 1, 1997 – 1998)
 Igloo-Gloo (February 2, 2004 – September 1, 2006)
 In the Night Garden... (February 25, 2008 – February 24, 2012)
 Iris, The Happy Professor (November 1, 1997 – August 29, 2003) (live action and animated)
 Lamb Chop's Play-Along (November 1, 1997 – 1999)
 Little Big Kid (October 12, 2000 – September 1, 2001)
 Little Star (November 1, 1997 – February 2, 2003) (live action and animated)
 Mighty Machines (February 7, 2004 – February 22, 2009)
 Mister Maker (February 26, 2008 – January 28, 2012)
 Mopatop's Shop (September 3, 2001 – September 6, 2002)
 Nini's Treehouse (January 29, 2001 – August 31, 2003) (live action and animated)
 The Not-Too-Late Show with Elmo (September 5, 2020)
 Once Upon a Hamster (September 14, 2002 – January 31, 2004)
 Open Sesame (September 1998 – September 2, 2001)
 PJ Katie's Farm (1999)
 Play with Me Sesame (November 7, 2005 – August 30, 2013)
 Potamus Park (November 1, 1997 – 1998)
 Rimba's Island (November 1, 1997 – 1999)
 Ryan's Mystery Playdate (July 6, 2019 – 2022)
 St. Bear's Dolls Hospital (September 1998 – September 3, 2000)
 Teletubbies (January 1999 – August 31, 2001)
 Today's Special (November 1, 1997 – September 2000) (live action and animated)
 Tots TV (November 1, 1997 – September 1999)
 Wimzie's House (January 29, 2001 – September 2, 2005)
 Yo Gabba Gabba! (February 25, 2008 – March 1, 2015)
 Zoboomafoo (February 1999 – August 31, 2003) (live action and animated)

Animated series
 3rd & Bird (September 7, 2009 – August 2013)
 44 Cats (September 30, 2019 –  November 2020)
 Abby's Flying Fairy School (2018–2019)
 The Adventures of Chuck and Friends (January 3, 2011 – August 2012)
 Amazing Animals (February 13, 2005 – February 22, 2008)
 Anatole (February 4, 2003 – February 3, 2005)
 Angelina Ballerina (September 11, 2002 – September 5, 2009)
 Angelina Ballerina: The Next Steps (September 7, 2009 – March 2, 2014)
 Animal Stories (September 4, 2000 – March–29, 2004)
 Archibald the Koala (September 7, 2001 – September 6, 2002) 
 The Backyardigans (October 11, 2004 - March 2022) 
 Babar (February 2, 2003 – March 2022) 
 Babar and the Adventures of Badou (February 2011 – 2015; July 26, 2021)
 The Berenstain Bears (January 2003 – August 2006; February 2007 – July 2009; July – November 2022)
 Bert and Ernie's Great Adventures (September 2, 2008 – August 30, 2013)
 Big Sister, Little Brother (September 4 – October 11, 2000)
 Blue's Clues (February 1999 – September 2007; March 2008 – April 2016; September 2016 – September 2018; April – November 2019) (live action and animated)
 Bob the Builder (September 3, 2001 – February 2014)
 Boblins (September 2006 – September 5, 2009)
 Brambly Hedge (2001–2004; sporadically)
 Butterbean's Cafe (January 5, 2019 – November, 2020)
 Care Bears (1999 – September 2, 2001; September 3, 2007 – 2008)
 Care Bears: Welcome to Care-a-Lot (September 8, 2012 – August 2014)
 Chomp Squad (2018–2019)
 Chuggington (February 28, 2009 – 2015)
 Clangers (January 8, 2016 – September 1, 2017; 2019)
 Cleo & Cuquin (April 5, 2019 – 2022)
 Corduroy (February 4, 2002 – January 2007)
 Deer Squad (March 21, 2021 – 2021)
 Dino Babies (November 1, 1997 – 1999)
 Dora and Friends: Into the City! (September 6, 2014 – September 15, 2019)
 Dora the Explorer (February 4, 2002 – August 29, 2022)
 Dorothy and the Wizard of Oz (June 2, 2018 – 2022)
 Enchanted Lands: Tales from the Faraway Tree (September 4, 2001 – August 28, 2003)
 Enchantimals (2018–2019) (animated)
 Faeries (2001-2004; sporadically)
 Fennec (September 1998 – 1999)
 Fifi and the Flowertots (February 25, 2008 – December 31, 2010)
 Fireman Sam (September 2011 – December 2013)
 The Forgotten Toys (2001–2002)
 Franklin and Friends (March 4, 2011)
 George Shrinks (February 5, 2002 – January 31, 2010)
 Go, Diego, Go! (September 7, 2005 – August 30, 2020)
 Go Jetters (2016–2017)
 Happy Ness: The Secret of the Loch (November 1, 1997 – 1999)
 Hello Kitty and Friends (November 1, 1997 – February 1, 2004)
 Hey Duggee (January 2016 – 2018; 2019)
 It's Itsy Bitsy Time! (1999 – August 29, 2003)
 Jane and the Dragon (September 2, 2016 – Summer 2016
 Jellabies (September 3, 2001 – May 16, 2004)
 Keroppi and Friends (November 1, 1997 – April 2002; June – August 2002)
 Kipper (September 4, 2001 – August 28, 2003)
 Kleo the Misfit Unicorn (September 12, 2002 – January 30, 2003; September 2, 2003 – August 31, 2006)
 The Koala Brothers (February 25, 2008 – January 2, 2011)
 Lalaloopsy (2013 – August 30th, 2014)
 The Land Before Time (September 2007 – 2008)
 Little Bear (September 7, 1998 – August 28, 2010)
 Little Grey Rabbit (September 4, 2001 – February 2, 2003; September 1, 2003 – May 16, 2004)
 Little People (July 14, 2006 – June 15, 2007; April 1, 2011-December 30, 2012)
 Littlest Pet Shop: A World of Our Own (2018–2019)
 Madeline (February 4, 2003 – January 2005)
 The Magic Key (September 9, 2002 – August 26, 2003; April 26 – May 7, 2004) (live action and animated)
 Maisy (September 6, 2001 – April 2003)
 Masha and the Bear (April 15, 2016 – 2020)
 Masha's Spooky Stories (February 15, 2018 – May 5, 2019)
 Masha's Tales (October 21, 2017 – May 5, 2019)
 Miffy and Friends (April 2003 – March 15, 2009)
 Mike The Knight
 Molang (July 6, 2020 – 2022)
 My Little Pony: Friendship Is Magic (January 11, 2011 – 2022)
 My Little Pony: Pony Life (June 21, 2020 – 2022)
 Nella the Princess Knight (May 6, 2017 – 2020)
 Ni Hao, Kai-Lan (February 26, 2008 – September 11, 2011; October 14, 2016 – December 31, 2016; February 12, 2021)
 Noddy in Toyland (September 7, 2009 – August 2012)
 Nouky and Friends (June 2008 – February 21, 2010)
 The Octonauts (March 30, 2012 – July 1, 2020)
 Odd-Jobbers (September 1, 2008 – December 31, 2010)
 Olivia (February 23, 2009 – August 2012)
 Oswald (September 9, 2002 – August 28, 2006)
 Pablo the Little Red Fox (September 3, 2001 – May 16, 2004; February – August 2005)
 Percy the Park Keeper (2001–2004; sporadically)
 Peter Rabbit (2013–2016; 2021-2022)
 Peg + Cat (March 2014 – 2020)
 Pocket Dragon Adventures (February 2000 – August 31, 2001)
 Pocoyo (September 5, 2005 – February 21, 2010)
 Postman Pat (September 6, 2001 – January 30, 2003; March 1, 2009 – July 31, 2011)
 Rainbow Rangers (October 15, 2019 – 2021)
 Ricky Zoom (October 5, 2019 – 2021)
 Roary the Racing Car (April 26, 2009 – February 2012)
 Robocar Poli (January 6, 2018 – 2021)
 Rolie Polie Olie (February 6, 2006 – February 22, 2009; September 6, 2010 – August 2012)
 Rubbadubbers (September 1, 2003 – September 1, 2006)
 Rusty Rivets (January 16 2017 – May 8, 2020; August 2020 - January 2, 2022) 
 Seven Little Monsters (February 4, 2001 – February 3, 2002)
 Shimmer and Shine (September 13, 2015 – 2021)
 Spider! (September 3, 2001 – August 31, 2003)
 Spot the Dog (September 3, 2001 – August 30, 2003) (live action and animated)
 Sunny Day (September 2, 2017 – 2020)
 Super BOOMi (May 19, 2019 – 2022)
 Super Wings (March 3, 2015 – 2020)
 Team Umizoomi (March 6, 2010–2019; December 21st, 2021) (live action and animated)
 Ted Sieger's Wildlife (September 3, 2001 – March 29, 2004) (live-action and animated)
 Thomas & Friends (September 1, 2003 – 2022)
 Timmy Time (September 7, 2009 – 2011)
 Timothy Goes to School (February 6, 2002 – May 2010)
 Transformers: Rescue Bots Academy (October 27, 2019 – 2021)
 Turtle Island (September 5, 2000 – January 28, 2001)
 Waybuloo (September 8, 2009 – September 8, 2012; July 6, 2014 – March 22, 2015)
 Wonder Pets! (September 4, 2006 – September 2017)
 The World of Peter Rabbit and Friends (2001 – 2004; sporadically)
 The WotWots (February 22, 2010 – March 7, 2014) (live action and animated)
 Wow! Wow! Wubbzy! (April 26, 2008 – May 30, 2009)
 Zack & Quack (March 1, 2014 – August 30, 2017)

Short-form programming

Live action series

Animated series

References

Treehouse TV original programming
Treehouse TV